The Women's javelin throw event at the 2011 World Championships in Athletics was held at the Daegu Stadium on September 1 and 2.

Barbora Špotáková, the reigning Olympic champion, topped the season's rankings with a throw of 69.45 m. Second-ranked Christina Obergföll had showed greater consistency, having won four of the Diamond League meetings before the championships. Mariya Abakumova, a 2009 World and 2008 Olympic medallist, was ranked third in both the Diamond League and world rankings. Others in good form were Sunette Viljoen (who set an African record two weeks earlier), Martina Ratej, Kathrina Molitor and Goldie Sayers. The 2009 world champion, Steffi Nerius, had retired.

Favorite Špotáková took the early lead, but Abakumova's second throw would lead into the 5th round.  Viljoen improved on her African record in the 5th round, but that was only enough to put her in third place. Špotáková then threw a new World Championship record, only to be passed on the following throw by Abakumova improving on the record and setting a new Russian National Record.

However, in 2018, the Athletics Integrity Unit decided to disqualify Abakumova because of doping, stripping her of the gold medal, which gets inherited by Špotáková.

Medalists

Records
Prior to the competition, the established records were as follows.

Qualification standards

Schedule

Results

Qualification
Qualification: Qualifying distance 61.00m (Q) or at 12 best athletes and ties (q) advance to the final

Final

References

External links
Javelin throw results at IAAF website

Javelin throw
Javelin throw at the World Athletics Championships
2011 in women's athletics